Duvdevani is a surname. Notable people with the surname include:

 Amit Duvdevani (born 1974), Israeli music producer
 Avraham Duvdevani
 Lior Duvdevani (born 1979), Israeli comedian
 Yehiel Duvdevani (1896–1988), Zionist activist and politician